Pollotarianism is the practice of adhering to a diet that incorporates poultry as the only source of meat in an otherwise vegetarian diet.

While pollo specifically means chicken in both Spanish and in Italian (with pollame meaning poultry in general in Italian), pollotarians are known to incorporate different forms of poultry, like duck and turkey in their diet. Pollotarians may also eat dairy products. The term "pollo-vegetarian" was first used in nutritional textbooks in the 1980s to describe a semi-vegetarian diet that incorporates poultry. Historian Rod Preece describes pollotarians as "those who refrain from mammals but are willing to eat the flesh of birds notably chickens."

Examples

Chauncey Depew was a pollotarian. In a 1925 interview aged 90, Depew stated that "For thirty years the only meat I've eaten has been poultry".

See also

Duck as food
Turkey as food
Chicken as food
Pescatarianism

References

Semi-vegetarianism
Diets
Poultry
Sustainable food system
Intentional living